LSFC may refer to:

In education:
Leyton Sixth Form College
Lowestoft Sixth Form College
Luton Sixth Form College

In sport:
Lancashire Steel F.C.
Lambourn Sports F.C.
Leinster Senior Football Championship, a Gaelic football competition in Ireland
London Scottish F.C.